is a Japanese voice actor from Hiroshima Prefecture, Japan. He is affiliated with Kenyu Office.

Filmography

Anime
2010
 Yu-Gi-Oh! 5D's (Rick, Hans)
2012
 Kingdom (Qu Hai)
 Gon (Saachii)
 The New Prince of Tennis (Chikahiko Matsudaira)
2013
 Galilei Donna (Marco)
 Gifu Dodo!! Kanetsugu to Keiji (Yamada Kihachi)
 Kingdom Season 2 (Qu Hai, Kō)
 Ace of Diamond (Kenjirō Shirasu, Hiroya Hosodayama, Nobu, Murata, Ninomiya, Daiki Fukuda, Yūto Mino)
 Teekyu (Bobby)
 Mushibugyo (Hideyori Toyotomi, Shidō)
2014
 Baby Steps (Nariyuki Koshimizu, Tanaka)
 Yowamushi Pedal Grande Road (Ryō Ibitani)
2015
 Assassination Classroom (Taisei Yoshida)
 Etotama (Tenchō)
 Gon (Choro)
 Ace of Diamond: Second Season (Kenjirō Shirasu, Kajiyama, Ninomiya, Daiki Fukuda)
 Baby Steps Season 2 (Nariyuki Koshimizu, Christopher)
2016
 Assassination Classroom 2nd Season (Taisei Yoshida)
2017
 Sakura Quest (Shibukawa)
 Black Clover (Salim Hapshass)
2019
Beastars (Voss)
2021
I-Chu: Halfway Through the Idol (Ban Jumonji)
Sorcerous Stabber Orphen: Battle of Kimluck (Salua)
Kuro-Gyaru ni Natta Kara Shinyū to Shite Mita (Hajime Tsuzuki)

Original video animation
 Ace of Diamond (Kenjirō Shirasu)
 Saiyuki Gaiden (Yamamura)

Theatrical animation
 Yowamushi Pedal: The Movie (Ryō Ibitani)

Video games
 Black Survival (Hyunwoo, Rosalio, Jan)
 Far Cry 3 (Riley)
 Metal Max 4: Gekkō no Diva (Sego Marden)

Dubbing

Live-action
 3-Headed Shark Attack (Greg)
 Assassin's Creed: Lineage (Ezio Auditore)
 The Bay (Mike)
 The Cabin in the Woods (Ronald the Intern (Tom Lenk))
 Car SOS (Tim Shaw)
 The Carrie Diaries (Sebastian Kydd (Austin Butler))
 A Cure for Wellness (Lockhart)
 Gilmore Girls (William)
 The Machine (Tim)
 Resident Evil: The Final Chapter (Dr. James Marks)
 The Shannara Chronicles (Wil Ohmsford)
 The Suite Life of Zack & Cody (Vance, Lenny)
 Whiskey Cavalier (Edgar Standish (Tyler James Williams))
 X-Men: Days of Future Past (Roberto da Costa/Sunspot)

Animation
 Hulk and the Agents of S.M.A.S.H. (Rick Jones/A-Bomb)
 My Little Pony: Friendship Is Magic (Soarin', Jet Set, Mr. Waddle, Thunderlane, Doctor Hooves, Ignenous "Iggy" Rock, Hoops, Caesar, Caramel, Lucky Clover, Comet Tail, Parcel Post, Doctor Hay, Fuzzy Slippers, Persnickety, Geri, Mr. Zippy, Vex, Serenity, Green Daze, Shady Daze)
 Uncle Grandpa (Evil Wizard)

References

External links
 Kenyu Office Profile
 

Living people
1977 births
Japanese male voice actors
Male voice actors from Hiroshima Prefecture